The South American Cross Country Championships is an annual continental cross country running competition for athletes from South America or, more specifically, member countries of CONSUDATLE. It was first held in 1986, making it the oldest of the continental cross country championships. The event is typically held in late February or early March.

The South American Championships in Athletics were the precursor to the competition in that cross country was featured on the main athletics programme between 1924 and 1949. After the introduction of an independent championships in 1986, multiple races were held: the initial competition schedule featured long races for senior men and women, and shorter races for junior men and women. This was expanded in 1991 with the addition of a youth competition for younger runners. Keeping in line with changes to the IAAF World Cross Country Championships, the South American championships also held senior short race competitions between 1998 and 2006, to complement the established long races. The short races were removed from the programme after their removal from the World Championships in 2006.

Brazil have been the most successful nation at the championships: they were undefeated in both of the long race team contests between 1993 and 2001.

Editions

Champions

Long course

Short course

References

External links

Report on 2005 races from IAAF

 
Continental athletics championships
Cross country running competitions
Cross country
Cross country
Athletics team events